The 1909 Alberta general election was the second general election held in the Province of Alberta, Canada on March 22, 1909, to elect 41 members of the Alberta legislature to the 2nd Alberta Legislature.

The incumbent Liberal Party led by Premier Alexander C. Rutherford was re-elected to a majority government with 36 of the 41 seats in the legislature, and just under 60 per cent of the popular vote. The Conservative Party led by Albert Robertson formed the official opposition, with only two members, with Robertson was defeated in his own seat in High River. The remaining three seats were split between smaller parties and independents.

Prior to the election, the Legislative Assembly passed An Act respecting the Legislative Assembly of Alberta in February 1909 which created an additional 16 seats in the Legislature, expanding from 25 members to a total of 41, and redistributed the boundaries of the provincial electoral districts. The Crowsnest Pass region was separated from the Pincher Creek electoral district and made into its own district Rocky Mountain. The high proportion of coal miners in this new district was reflected in the election of a Socialist candidate.

The cities of Edmonton and Calgary were each allocated a second seat in the legislature, as their populations had doubled since the previous election. The two electoral districts became multi-seat (two seat) districts. Each voter there could cast up to two votes under the block voting system. Edmonton elected two Liberal candidates, while Calgary elected one Liberal and one Conservative candidate. This was the first example in Alberta political history of mixed representation coming from a single district. Alberta would use a mixture of single and multiple seat districts in each general election until 1956. Mixed semi-proportional representation elected in multi-seat districts would be seen again and again prior to 1956.

The election in the Athabasca electoral district was conducted on July 15, 1909, due to the remoteness of the riding.

After the election, the Liberal government under Premier Rutherford was struck with the Alberta and Great Waterways Railway scandal shortly after the election which divided the party. Rutherford resigned in 1910 and was replaced as Premier by Arthur Sifton.

Background

1905 general election 

The 1905 Alberta general election proved to be a bitter battle between the powerful Liberal machine under Rutherford and the less organized Conservative Party under R. B. Bennett. The Liberal's advantage with incumbency, controlling the machinery of government with Rutherford being the first appointed Premier, and superior organizing ability led to the landslide Liberal victory, capturing 22 of the 25 seats in the Legislature, while Bennett's Conservative Party gained a mere two seats. Historian Lewis Thomas argues the Liberal landslide was due to the incumbent position of the Liberal government which in its two months had not been tested with scandal or policy, making it difficult for effective opposition and criticism, all the while being able to maintain all the powers of patronage an incumbent would have. The Liberals effectively exercised the machinery of government from both the provincial and federal level, with Thomas noting a few surviving written suggestions for Liberal appointments. Furthermore, Thomas argues the strong positions taken by the Conservative Party on provincial right to control the school system and public lands did not make a significant impression on voters.

The Conservatives attributed their defeat to the Roman Catholic vote which was felt to be sympathetic to Laurier for his support of separate schools, with Bennett himself attributing his loss in Calgary by 37 votes to William Henry Cushing to the Roman Catholic influences, labour vote and his time travelling outside of the district. Bennett quickly resigned his position as leader and temporarily retired from politics.

By-elections 
Four by-elections were contested during the first session of the Alberta Legislature, three of which took place in 1906 and each resulted in the incumbent Liberal party retaining the seats. The first in Lethbridge held after Liberal Leverett George DeVeber's appointment to the Senate of Canada on March 8, 1906, saw Liberal William Simmons capturing 43.9 per cent of the vote, defeating Labour candidate Frank Henry Sherman with 37.4 per cent, and Conservative A. E. Keffer with 18.7 per cent of the vote. After Vermilion representative Matthew McCauley was appointed Warden of the Edmonton Penitentiary, Liberal James Bismark Holden was subsequently acclaimed as on July 16, 1906. When Gleichen representative Charles Stuart was appointed to the Supreme Court of the Northwest Territories in October 1906, the subsequent by-election saw Liberal Ezra Riley capture 56.3 per cent of the vote, defeating Conservative William L. Walsh.

A major shock came in the 1909 by-election in Lethbridge, after William Simmons resigned to contest the 1908 Canadian federal election in Medicine Hat. Labour candidate Donald McNabb was acclaimed on January 8, 1909, as the representative for Lethbridge, becoming the first Labour representative in Alberta.

Election

Electoral boundaries 
The boundaries of the electoral districts for the first Alberta general election in 1905 were prescribed in the Alberta Act (Canada) and were a source of controversy with accusations of gerrymandering in favour of the Liberal Party and northern Alberta. Calgary-based newspapers the Calgary Herald, Calgary Albertan, and Eye-Opener made claims that the borders constituted preferential treatment for Edmonton and northern Alberta. Prime Minister Laurier had received assurances that the distribution was fair from Alberta Members of Parliament Talbot and Oliver, but when word of Calgary's opposition reached Ottawa.

The question of whether there was population-based gerrymandering returns different responses. Historian Lewis Thomas notes the final layout favoured northern Alberta with one additional district, despite Oliver and Talbot being aware that more than 1,000 more voters south of the Red Deer River participated in the 1904 Territorial election. Alexander Bruce Kilpatrick notes that the census results from 1906 shows that if the 38th township is chosen as the dividing line (City of Red Deer), there were 93,601 persons in northern Alberta and 87,381 in southern Alberta, with an additional 4,430 residing in the 38th township. Kilpatrick claims that people misconstrued where the population of the Strathcona census district lived, assuming most were south of the 38th Township, when a significant majority were in fact north of the township. Kilpatrick however, describes the layout of the electoral districts as "blatant manipulation of the electoral map to suit a particular purpose". In particular Kilpatrick claims that Oliver designed the constituencies to maximize the influence of Edmonton, the borders did not align with the previous constituencies from the North-west Territories legislature, and instead was drawn to have several ridings touching the city's borders. At the same time, Calgary did not have the same advantages in design, and was reduced from two seats in the North-west Territories Legislature to one in the new Alberta Legislature.

The 1st Alberta Legislature waited until the fourth and final session to address changes to provincial elections. The government introduced An Act respecting the Legislative Assembly of Alberta which radically altered the electoral map in Alberta and extended the maximum term of the Legislature from four years to five years. Sixteen new seats were added to the Legislature lifting the number of seats from 25 to 41. Seven of the new constituencies were located South of the central community of Red Deer, and seven in North of Red Deer, while two districts adjacent to the Red Deer community in land to be opened up for settlement by new rail roads. The districts of Calgary and Edmonton were provided a second seat and elections were to be held using multiple non-transferable vote. Historian Lewis Thomas notes the idea of redistribution was desirable with the rapid increase in population and development, and the significant increase in seats was relatively uncontroversial. Leader of the Conservative Party and High River representative Albert Robertson criticized extending the length of time between elections from four years to five years, and the provisions for two members elected to represent the single district in Calgary and Edmonton. Wetaskiwin representative and Liberal Anthony Rosenroll criticized the changes, believing the rural constituencies deserved greater representation.

Voting and eligibility 

Under the first provincial election, voter and candidate eligibility requirements remained in place under the rules set by the North-West Legislative Assembly under The Territories Elections Ordinance. The right to vote was provided to male British subjects who were 21 years of age or older, and had resided in the North-West Territories for at least 12 months, and the electoral district for the three months prior to the vote. The vote took place on November 9, 1905, with polls open between 9:00 a.m. and 5:00 p.m. In 1905 Albertans would vote by marking an "X" on a blank sheet of paper using a coloured pencil which corresponded to the candidate whom they wished to vote for, red for Liberal and blue for Conservative.

The fourth session of the first Legislative Assembly introduced An Act respecting Elections of Members of the Legislative Assembly. The Act required voters to be male British subjects, 21 years of age or older, who had resided in Alberta for at least 12 months, and the electoral district for the three months prior to the vote. The new Act continued to disenfranchise judges, prisoners, and Indigenous persons.

The new Act also provided the government with the option of moving the election date for the electoral districts of Athabasca and Peace River to a later date to provide more time for information from nominated candidates to be distributed. The provision proved to be unnecessary for Peace River after Liberal James Cornwall was acclaimed, but was used for Athabasca whose election was held more than three months later on July 15, 1909.

Unlike the 1905 election, the Returning Officers were required to print ballots with each candidate's name listed in alphabetical order.

Campaign 
The 1st Alberta Legislature was dissolved and the election writ was dropped on March 22, 1909.

Liberal 
The Liberal Party under Rutherford had won 22 of the 25 seats in the 1905 election, and focused on province-building measures during the first Legislature. The Liberal campaign focused on tying the Conservative Party as subordinates to the Canadian Pacific Company, describing the party as "butler-in-ordinary" to the company. Canadian Pacific was hostile to the Liberal Party under Rutherford, as the government sought to collect taxes on railway lands, passed the Workers Compensation Act, limited the work day for coal mines to eight hours, rigidly enforced Sabbath restrictions, and the new provincial railway policy to bring new lines to the province.

Premier Rutherford spent much of the election in Southern Alberta conservative strongholds such as Calgary, Lethbridge and Pincher Creek, campaigning for candidates. The Liberal Party itself ran on the slogan "Rutherford, Reliability, and Railroads". Rutherford also made appeals to the electorate to not consider the election a partisan affair, noting all voters were "Albertans" and that the "Province must stand before the party." During the election, the Liberal Party received the unlikely support of prominent Calgary lawyer and conservative Paddy Nolan. Nolan went so far as to campaign with Rutherford across the province against his own conservative party.

The Liberal Party once again won a strong majority of the vote and seats in the Legislature. Eight members were returned by acclamation, all members of Cabinet had strong majorities, and the party dominated Northern Alberta.

Conservative 
Following the disappointing results of the 1905 election and failure to capture his own seat in Calgary, Conservative Party leader R. B. Bennett resigned as leader and temporarily swore off politics. Only two Conservative candidates were elected, Hiebert in Rosebud and Albert Robertson in High River, and when the first session began in 1906 Robertson was named Leader of the Opposition. In the Legislature, Robertson called for public ownership of the telephone system and railways at a time when the government's policy was to leave both under the control of the private sector.

The Conservative Party convention met in 1909 prior to the election to determine party policy and select a leader. Robertson was viewed as a staunch and loyal conservative but was criticized for his imperial connection. The other Conservative in the Legislature Cornelius Hiebert had little interest in partisan politics, and sided increasingly with the Liberal government. Hiebert and Robertson clashed during session, and although Hiebert supported the party platform at Convention, he chose to contest the 1909 election as an Independent. Leadership of the Conservative Party was offered to Maitland Stewart McCarthy, a lawyer and Member of the House of Commons for Calgary. McCarthy declined the offer of leadership as he would have to resign his federal seat which he won in a controversial election in 1908, and felt the resignation would be seen as an admission of guilt. Robert Brett despite not contesting the election was seen as the head of the Conservative Party, and R. B. Bennett chose to return to politics after he was nominated as a candidate without his consent, but did not consider leadership of the party again. The convention failed to select a permanent leader, and despite Robertson being the Leader of the Opposition in the Legislature, the party left the convention effectively leaderless.

The convention platform agreed with many aspects of Liberal government policy, but sought government ownership in areas such as railways and telephones. The platform included a promise for Initiative, Referendum, and Recall, as well as a plebiscite on the prohibition of liquor trafficking. The platform also included calls to reforest areas subject to forest fires, a commission for electrical power, the establishment of an experimental farm, civil service reform, construction of highways, government construction of grain elevators, and other activities.

The Conservative Party once again failed to make a strong impression with voters, capturing only two seats in the Legislature, Bennett in Calgary and George Hoadley in the neighbouring Okotoks. Historian Lewis Thomas notes the Conservatives were forced to accept another "moral victory", although prominent Conservative William Antrobus Griesbach noted he had become tired of "moral victories".

Other parties 
The 1909 election saw Socialist Charles M. O'Brien elected in the coal mining district of Rocky Mountain.

The organized Labour party under incumbent leader and Member for Lethbridge City, Donald McNabb failed to secure any seats in the Legislature, with McNabb placing a distant third in his district.

Independent-Conservative candidate Edward Michener defeated the Liberal incumbent John Thomas Moore in Red Deer. The Conservative Party chose not to field a candidate in the district, and Michener captured 51.3 per cent of the vote.

Aftermath 

The Edmonton Bulletin noted after the beginning of the 2nd Legislature, that the Conservative Party despite remaining at two seats had improved their position with the presence of R. B. Bennett in the legislature, describing him as superior to both Robertson and Hiebert in politics and debate.

Alberta and Great Waterways Railway scandal 

Prior to the 1909 election, the Alberta and Great Waterways Railway (A&GW) President William Clarke had announced that the line would be completed by the end of 1912, ahead of schedule.  When the A&GW bonds went on sale in London in November 1909, the issue was oversubscribed.  The following month, the contract for ties was awarded.  Everything seemed to be progressing as planned when, at the beginning of the new legislative session, Liberal backbencher John R. Boyle asked the government a series of innocuous questions about the company and the guarantees made to it.  Rutherford, Minister of Railways as well as Premier, responded to the questions in writing.  Before he did so, however, a rumour began to circulate that William Henry Cushing, Minister of Public Works, had resigned from the cabinet.

Boyle and Conservative leader R. B. Bennett questioned Rutherford about the rumours, but Rutherford initially refused to make any announcement.  The next day, however, the rumour was confirmed when the Premier read Cushing's letter of resignation in the legislature.  In this letter, Cushing gave his reasons for resigning as disagreement with the government's railway policy, which he claimed was developed without his involvement or consent.  Rutherford disagreed with this claim, and expressed his regret for Cushing's resignation.

The scandal split the Liberal Party: Rutherford's Minister of Public Works, William Henry Cushing, resigned from the government and publicly attacked its railway policy, and a large portion of the Liberal caucus voted to defeat the government in the Legislative Assembly of Alberta. The government survived all of these votes. Rutherford largely placated the legislature by appointing a royal commission to investigate the affair, but pressure from Lieutenant-Governor George Bulyea and unrest within his own caucus forced Rutherford's resignation and his replacement by Arthur Sifton.

The royal commission gave its report months after Rutherford resigned.  The majority on the commission did not find Rutherford or his cabinet guilty of any wrongdoing, but criticized them for poor judgment, both concerning to the loan guarantees and the exemptions the A&GW received from provincial legislation. A minority report was more sympathetic, and declared the allegations against them "disproved".

James Cornwall, a Liberal backbencher who supported Rutherford, fared somewhat worse: his personal financial involvement in the railway gave rise to "suspicious circumstances", but he too was not proven guilty of any wrongdoing.

Besides provoking Rutherford's resignation, the scandal opened rifts in the Liberal Party that took years to heal. Sifton eventually smoothed over most of these divisions, but was frustrated in his railway policy by legal defeats. He ultimately adopted a similar policy to Rutherford's, and the A&GW was eventually built by private interests using the money raised from provincial loan guarantees.

Results

Full results

|-
!rowspan="2" colspan="2"|Party
!rowspan="2"|Leader
!rowspan="2"|Candidates
!colspan="4"|Seats
!colspan="3"|Popular vote
|-
!1905
!Dissol.
!1909
!+/-
!Votes
!%
!+/- (pp)

|align=left|Alexander Cameron Rutherford
| 42 || 22 || 22 ||36 ||+14 || 29,634 || 59.26% || +3.31

|align=left|Albert Robertson
| 29 || 2 || 2 ||2 || 0 || 15,848 || 31.69% || −5.44

| colspan="2" style="text-align:left;"|Independent
| 6 || 1 || 0 ||1 || +1 || 1,695 || 3.39% || −3.53
|-

| colspan="2" style="text-align:left;"|Independent Liberal
| 2 || 0 || 0 ||1 || +1 || 1,311 || 2.62% || 
|-

|align=left|
| 2 || 0 || 0 ||1 || +1 || 1,302 || 2.60% || 
|-

|align=left| Donald McNabb
| 1 || 0 || 1 ||0 || -1 || 214 || 0.43% || 
|-
| style="text-align:left;" colspan="3"|Total
|82 ||25 ||25 ||41 || || 50,004 || 100%  ||
|-
| style="text-align:left;" colspan="11" | Source: 
|}

Members elected
For complete electoral history, see individual districts

|-
|Alexandra
||
|Alwyn Bramley-Moore77164.63%
|
|James R. Lowery42235.37%
|
|
|
|New District
|-
|Athabasca
||
|Jean Côté23059.59%
|
|V. Maurice71.81%
|
|William Bredin (Liberal)14938.60%
||
|William Fletcher Bredin
|-
|rowspan="2"|Calgary
||
|William Henry Cushing2,57926.90%
|
|Thomas Blow1,90719.88%
|
|George Howell (Socialist)7477.79%
|rowspan="2" |
|rowspan="2" |William Henry Cushing
|-
|
|William Egbert1,93320.16%
||
|R. B. Bennett2,42325.27%
|
|
|-
|Camrose
||
|George P. Smith1,01055.16%
|
|I.W.T. McEachern82144.84%
|
|
|
|New District
|-
|Cardston
||
|John William Woolf52157.44%
|
|Levi Harker38642.56%
|
|
||
|John William Woolf
|-
|Claresholm
||
|Malcolm McKenzie69661.87%
|
|Fred Garrow42938.13%
|
|
|
|New District
|-
|Cochrane
||
|Charles Wellington Fisher62767.56%
|
|Robert George Brett30132.44%
|
|
||
|New District from Banff and RosebudCharles Wellington Fisher
|-
|Didsbury
||
|Joseph E. Stauffer99373.18%
|
|Samuel T. Scarlett20815.33%
|
|Cornelius Hiebert15611.50%
||
|New District from RosebudCornelius Hiebert
|-
|rowspan="2" |Edmonton
||
|Charles Wilson Cross3,28240.01%
|
|Albert Freeman Ewing1,59519.45%
|
|John Gailbraith3484.24%
|rowspan=2 |
|rowspan=2|Charles Wilson Cross
|-
||
|John Alexander McDougall2,97736.30%
|
|
|
|
|-
|Gleichen
||
|Ezra H. Riley77059.46%
|
|James Shouldice52540.54%
|
|
||
|Ezra Riley
|-
|High River
||
|Louis Melville Roberts60450.33%
|
|George Douglas Stanley59649.67%
|
|
||
|Albert J. Robertson
|-
|Innisfail
||
|John A. Simpson51953.45%
|
|George W. West45246.55%
|
|
||
|John A. Simpson
|-
|Lac Ste. Anne
||
|Peter GunnAcclaimed
|
|
|
|
|
|New District
|-
|Lacombe
||
|William Franklin PufferAcclaimed
|
|
|
|
||
|William Franklin Puffer
|-
|Leduc
||
|Robert T. TelfordAcclaimed
|
|
|
|
||
|Robert T. Telford
|-
|Lethbridge City
||
|William Ashbury Buchanan52944.12%
|
|William C. Ives45638.03%
|
|Donald McNabb (Labour)21417.85%
||
|New District from LethbridgeDonald McNabb
|-
|Lethbridge District
|
|John H. Rivers62043.94%
|
|
||
|Archibald J. McLean (Ind. Liberal)79156.06%
|
|New District from Lethbridge
|-
|Macleod
||
|Colin Genge34251.12%
|
|E.P. McNeill32748.88%
|
|
||
|Malcolm McKenzie
|-
|Medicine Hat
||
|William Thomas Finlay1,24971.66%
|
|Francis O. Sissons49428.34%
|
|
||
|William Thomas Finlay
|-
|Nanton
||
|John M. Glendenning43954.88%
|
|Albert J. Robertson36145.13%
|
|
|
|New District
|-
|Okotoks
|
|Malcolm McHardy40743.72%
||
|George Hoadley52456.28%
|
|
|
|New District
|-
|Olds
||
|Duncan Marshall76064.63%
|
|George McDonald41635.37%
|
|
|
|New District
|-
|Pakan
||
|Prosper-Edmond LessardAcclaimed
|
|
|
|
|
|New District
|-
|Peace River
||
|James K. CornwallAcclaimed
|
|
|
|
||
|Thomas A. Brick
|-
|Pembina
||
|Henry William McKenneyAcclaimed
|
|
|
|
|
|New District
|-
|Pincher Creek
||
|David Warnock56057.26%
|
|E.J. Mitchell41842.74%
|
|
||
|John Plummer Marcellus
|-
|Ponoka
||
|William A. Campbell46667.05%
|
|John A. Jackson22932.95%
|
|
||
|John R. McLeod
|-
|rowspan="2" |Red Deer
|rowspan="2" |
|rowspan="2" |John T. Moore49438.56%
|rowspan="2" |
|rowspan="2" |
||
|Edward Michener65751.29%
|rowspan="2" |
|rowspan="2" |John T. Moore
|-
|
|Donald McClure13010.15%
|-
|Rocky Mountain
|
|John Angus Macdonald52035.45%
|
|Henry Edward Lyon39226.72%
||
|Charles M. O'Brien (Socialist)55537.83%
|
|New District
|-
|Sedgewick
||
|Charles StewartAcclaimed
|
|
|
|
|
|New District
|-
|St. Albert
||
|Lucien Boudreau52850.97%
|
|
|
|Wilfrid Gariépy (Liberal)39337.93%Omer St. Germain (Ind. Liberal)11511.10%
||
|Henry William McKenney
|-
|Stettler
||
|Robert L. Shaw87371.27%
|
|J.K. Creighton35228.73%
|
|
|
|New District
|-
|Stony Plain
||
|John A. McPherson39843.74%
|
|John McKinley10811.87%
|
|Dan Bronx (Ind.)25027.47%Charlie R. Cropley (Ind.)15416.92%
||
|John A. McPherson
|-
|Strathcona
||
|Alexander Cameron Rutherford1,03485.67%
|
|Rice Sheppard17314.33%
|
|
||
|Alexander Cameron Rutherford
|-
|Sturgeon
||
|John Robert BoyleAcclaimed
|
|
|
|
||
|John Robert Boyle
|-
|Vegreville
||
|James Bismark Holden1,24972.66%
|
|F.W. Fane47027.34%
|
|
|
|New District
|-
|Vermilion
||
|Archibald Campbell91966.55%
|
|Albert Richard Aldridge46233.45%
|
|
||
|James Bismark Holden
|-
|Victoria
||
|Francis A. WalkerAcclaimed
|
|
|
|
||
|Francis A. Walker
|-
|Wetaskiwin
||
|Charles H. Olin71359.82%
|
|James George Anderson47940.18%
|
|
||
|Anthony Sigwart de Rosenroll 
|-
|}

See also
List of Alberta political parties

Notes

References

Works cited

Further reading
 

1909 elections in Canada
1909
March 1909 events
1909 in Alberta